Dheeraj Kumar (born 18 August 1994) is an Indian cricketer. He made his List A debut for Himachal Pradesh in the 2016–17 Vijay Hazare Trophy on 26 February 2017.

References

External links
 

1994 births
Living people
Indian cricketers
Himachal Pradesh cricketers
Place of birth missing (living people)